Cohen House is a private house on Old Church Street in Chelsea, London. It was designed and built in 1935–1936 by the architects Erich Mendelsohn and Serge Chermayeff for the Cohen family. 

It adjoins the house at 66 Old Church Street built at the same time by Walter Gropius and Maxwell Fry for a cousin of the Cohen's. 

The latter house has been altered beyond recognition but by comparison Cohen House is well preserved. The large conservatory, to the design of Norman Foster, was added at the south end of the house in the 1970s for Sir Paul Hamlyn.

The house and its immediate neighbour were prominent modernist housing in a city still then largely untouched by Modern architecture. It 1970 it was listed Grade II* on the National Heritage List for England.

References

Grade II* listed houses in London
Grade II* listed buildings in the Royal Borough of Kensington and Chelsea
Houses completed in 1936
Erich Mendelsohn buildings
Modernist architecture in London
Houses in the Royal Borough of Kensington and Chelsea